Many states of the United States have adopted official dances as one of their state symbols. The practice has extended to U.S. territories and Washington, D.C.

Starting in the 1970s, many states adopted square dance as their state dance, the result of a campaign by square dancers to make it the national dance.

Table

See also

 Lists of U.S. state insignia
 Flags of the U.S. states

References

External links
 "The State Folk Dance Conspiracy: Fabricating a National Folk Dance", originally published in Old-Time Herald, v.4(7) pp. 9–12, Spring 1995.  https://juliannemangin.com/the-state-folk-dance-conspiracy/ Accessed 8 Dec 2017

.List
U.S. state dances
Lists of United States state symbols